Jean-Baptiste Giraud (1752 – 14 February 1830) was a French sculptor.

Biography
Giraud was born in Aix-en-Provence.  Made rich by his uncle's inheritance, he spent eight years in Italy, to study the Ancient Arts there. His works were only exhibited in the Salon of 1789 and he bought a town-house in place Vendôme in Paris, where he set up a free-entry museum for other artists.  He died in Bouleaux (Fontenailles).

A piece of paper saying he was accepted at the Royal Academy for Painting and Sculpture, Achille blessé, is located in the Musée Granet in Aix-en-Provence.

References

1752 births
1830 deaths
People from Aix-en-Provence
18th-century French sculptors
French male sculptors
19th-century French sculptors
19th-century French male artists
18th-century French male artists